St. Michael Catholic High School is a private, Roman Catholic, co-educational high school in Fairhope, Alabama, United States. It was established in 2016 and is located in the Roman Catholic Archdiocese of Mobile.

The school opened with ninth and tenth grades on August 17, 2016, adding a junior class in 2017 and a senior class in 2018. In 2021, the school achieved its maximum enrollment of 350 students. Faustin Weber was the founding principal, hired in 2015, one year before the school opened. Upon his leaving in 2022, Paul Knapstein became the school's second principal. 

As part of a voting process the year before the school opened, future students voted between two choices of mascots: the "Sharks" and the "Cardinals." As per the majority, the "Cardinals" was chosen. The school aspires for its students to become "scholars, leaders and disciples of Jesus Christ."

Curriculum 
The school's curriculum allows students to take courses at the Collegiate Studies or Honors/Advanced Placement level. The school requires four years of core subjects in Theology, Math, English, History and Science, one year of Physical Education and a half year of Health. Freshmen and sophomores must also take a foreign language (either Spanish or Latin) and an arts elective (either Chorus, Band or Art) In their junior and senior year, students have three electives in addition to the five core classes. They may opt to take a third or fourth year of a foreign language and/or the Arts among their choices.

Students take 8 classes each semester. On Mondays, they attend all 8 classes, whereas on Tuesday they attend 6 classes, with two classes rotating out of the schedule each of those days. Students may earn a total of 32 credits during their four-year tenure.

The school offers A.P. classes in Human Geography, American History, English Comp, English Lit, Psychology, Spanish, Government, BC Calculus and BC Physics. In 2021, forty-nine students were named A.P. Scholars by the College Board, including 9 "Scholars with Distinction" and 11 "Scholars with Honor."

Fine Arts program 
The school began with a Band and Choral program. Students have the option to take four years of one or the other. In its second year, the school began an Art program (2d/3D). In the words of the principal, Faustin Weber, "It is the school's intention to make the Arts central to the life of the school."

Houses 
The school has a house system in which students are divided into four houses, each named after the early bishops of Mobile: Michael Portier, John Quinlan, Jeremiah O'Sullivan, and Edward Patrick Allen. The houses compete against each other for the Annual 'House Cup' and serve as the foundation for the student council of the school.

Athletics 
The school is an AHSAA sponsored school competing at the 4A level. It consists of football, men's and women's basketball, baseball, swimming, cross-country bowling, volleyball, softball, golf, tennis and men's and women's soccer. There is also a cheerleader squad for both the football and basketball teams. The cross country team was the school's first state championship team in 2019, whereas its cheerleading team won the state championship in 2020. The men's swim team finished second in 2019.

In the spring of 2020, the school announced that Philip Rivers, then-quarterback of the Indianapolis Colts, would be its future football coach upon Rivers’ retirement from the NFL. He retired after the 2020 season and became the school's coach in March 2021. The school opened a new all- sports field house in March 2021, which  includes a weight room, locker rooms, coaching and physical training offices, and a multimedia room.

References

Fairhope, Alabama
Schools in Baldwin County, Alabama
Catholic secondary schools in Alabama
Private high schools in Alabama
Educational institutions established in 2016
2016 establishments in Alabama
Roman Catholic Archdiocese of Mobile